A tor enclosure is a prehistoric monument found in the southwestern part of Great Britain. These monuments emerged around 4000 BCE in the early Neolithic.

Tor enclosures are large enclosures situated near natural rock outcrops, especially tors, on hilltops or the sides of hills. They consist of one or more roughly circular stone walls built around the tor. They are comparable to the causewayed enclosures found elsewhere in the British Isles and many are of similar Neolithic date although others are from later in prehistory.

Examples 
The best known examples are Carn Brea in Cornwall, the first to be identified, following excavations in the early 1970s, and Helman Tor between Bodmin and Lostwithiel in the same county.

Other possible examples are:
 Rough Tor on Bodmin Moor, Cornwall
 Stowe's Hill, also on Bodmin Moor
 Whittor on Dartmoor.

See also 
 Tor cairn

References 
 

Types of monuments and memorials
Stone Age Britain